Zhu Zhaoxiang (1921 – 28 November 2011), also known as Zhao-xiang Zhu, was a Chinese engineer, educator and a pioneer of explosive mechanics in China. He was the first President of Ningbo University.

Biography
Feb 4, 1921, Zhu was born in Zhenhai County (current Zhenhai District), Ningbo, Zhejiang Province. Both his father and grandfather were fishermen. In 1949, Zhu graduated from the Department of Civil Engineering, Zhejiang University. In the early 1940s, Zhu joined the Communist Party of China (CPC). From 1944 to 1949, Zhu was a lecturer and assistant in the Department of Civil Engineering, Zhejiang University.

In 1957, because of his right-wing political views and statements, Zhu was expelled from the CPC. Zhu was reaccepted and rejoined the party in the Deng Xiaoping era. From 1959 to 1988, Zhu taught mechanics at the University of Science and Technology of China (USTC); he was a lecturer, associate professor, professor, and the leader of explosive mechanics research at USTC, in chronological order.  From 1985 to 1988, Zhu served as the first President of Ningbo University. Since 1989, Zhu continued his position at the Institute of Mechanics, Chinese Academy of Sciences as a senior researcher.

References

Engineers from Zhejiang
Zhejiang University alumni
1921 births
2011 deaths
Academic staff of Ningbo University
Presidents of Ningbo University
Educators from Ningbo
Academic staff of the University of Science and Technology of China